Tryokhlozhinsky is a rural locality (a khutor) and the administrative center of Tryokhlozhinskoye Rural Settlement, Alexeyevsky District, Volgograd Oblast, Russia. The population was 337 as of 2010.

Geography 
Tryokhlozhinsky is located 42 km southwest of Alexeyevskaya (the district's administrative centre) by road. Arepyev is the nearest rural locality.

References 

Rural localities in Alexeyevsky District, Volgograd Oblast